Dmitry Alekseyevich Glukhovsky (born 12 June 1979) is a Russian author and journalist best known for the science fiction novel Metro 2033 and its sequels. As a journalist, Dmitry Glukhovsky has worked for Euronews, RT in its early years, and others. Aside from his native Moscow, Glukhovsky has also lived in Israel, Germany, and France.

Biography

Personal life and activism
Dmitry Glukhovsky was born and raised in Moscow. His Jewish father Alexei worked as an editor for Gosteleradio, an agency that ran television and radio programming in the USSR, while his Russian mother Larisa worked as a photo editor for Tass agency. He graduated from a school in Arbat District and, having already decided to become a writer, conceived the idea for the post-apocalyptic novel Metro 2033 at the age of 15. At the age of 17, he left Russia to study in Israel and lived there for four and a half years. While living in Israel he learned Hebrew, and earned a university degree in Journalism and International Relations at the Hebrew University in Jerusalem. He completed this degree in Hebrew, no differently to native-language Israeli students most of whom were five years older than him. While talking about the experience, he said: "not that I started feeling myself a Jew, but I definitely started feeling an Israeli."

The writer was married to producer Elena Glukhovskaya, whom he met while working at Russia Today. The couple have two children. On VDud, Glukhovsky revealed he and Elena divorced earlier in 2020.

In 2021, Glukhovsky publicly supported the arrested Russian opposition activist Alexei Navalny and demanded his release in an online video. In the wake of the Russian invasion of Ukraine, Glukhovsky has shown support to Ukraine, including a public statement aired on Arte. On 7 June 2022, Glukhovsky revealed he was placed on the Russian federal wanted list; he wrote on his Telegram channel that he was accused of discrediting the Russian Armed Forces due to a post he made on Instagram. After a Moscow district court ordered Glukhovsky's arrest in absentia, he faces up to 10 or 15 years in prison. The arrest in absentia has been issued on May 13. In October, Glukhovsky was added to the list of "foreign agents" by the justice ministry.

Career

Glukhovsky began writing Metro 2033 as his first novel at the age of 18, and then published it on his website in 2002, available for all to read for free as an interactive experiment. First published in print form in 2005, the book and its sequels turned into a multimedia franchise including a video game series. 

From 2002 to 2007, he worked at the global European media platform Euronews in Lyon, France, after which he returned to Russia and continued his career at the newly-created Russia Today (RT). Over the course of three years he traveled halfway around the world, was a Kremlin pool journalist, visited the Baikonur Cosmodrome and the exclusion zone of the Chernobyl Nuclear Power Plant, as well as the North Pole, from which he made the world's first direct telecast in July 2007. He has also worked with the German radio station Deutsche Welle and the British television channel Sky News. From 2007 to 2009, he worked at Radio Mayak. He covered the 2006 Lebanon War as a war correspondent, writing reports under mortar shelling.

Works of fiction

Night

Animal Tales

Metro 2033

Metro 2033 is a 2002 post-apocalyptic fiction novel by Dmitry Glukhovsky. The first part of a three book series, Metro 2033 is about the last survivors of a nuclear holocaust, living inside the Moscow metro system. The novel brought in the creation of the Metro game series, Metro 2033, Metro Last Light, and Metro Exodus.

Infinita Tristessa

The End of the Road

Dusk
The novel Dusk was published in 2007. It is a dark tale of the translator Dmitry who receives an order for translations of a dozen pages cut out of what seems to be a several centuries-old Spanish book. He discovers that the book is a journal of an expedition of the Conquistadors dating back to the 16th century. Dmitry is reading this story chapter by chapter, collecting the full translation at home. Finally, the story starts penetrating his reality and threatening his life. Dusk was also an online experiment as Glukhovsky was publishing it chapter by chapter in his blog.

Metro 2034

Metro 2033 was followed by Metro 2034 in 2009, which was also available for free online, both as text and as a collaborative art-project with Russian electronic performer Dolphin and visual artist Anton Gretchko.

Tales About the Motherland
In 2010, the AST publishing house released a new book by Glukhovsky, Tales about the Motherland, a compilation of satirical stories about Russian realities.

Metro 2033 (game)

Glukhovsky collaborated with Ukrainian company 4A Games in the development of the game. While he did not write the game's story, it is based on his novel.

Futu.re
Futu.re is a dystopian novel published in September 2013 in Russia. The story is set in Europe in the 25th century when humanity has invented a way to stop aging. In order to keep Europe from overflowing, the government was forced to introduce a policy whereby if a couple decide to have a child either the mother or the father would have to give up their immortality. The story is built around a young man who is part of a squad in charge of stopping the overpopulation of Europe by punishing those who do not register their child.

Metro: Last Light

The game is not based on the novel Metro 2034, because the developers felt it was less fit for a game than the original book. Glukhovsky helped to write the story and dialogue for the game. He realized that the story he wrote for the game was too big, so instead he published the whole story in Metro 2035.

The Gospel According to Artyom
In 2013, the publisher Dark Horse Comics announced a short tie-in comic set in between the games Metro 2033 and Metro: Last Light. It was exclusively available for customers who pre-ordered Metro: Last Light on Steam. However, despite the initial announcement and the involvement of the game's developer 4A Games on the comic, the comic itself cited the story as being set in between the novels Metro 2033 and Metro 2035. Glukhovsky is credited for the story, while Landry Walker is cited as being responsible for the script, with Paul Azaceta handling the art.

Metro 2035

The Outpost

Text

Text is Glukhovsky's first realistic (not the typical sci-fi) novel, published in 2017. It won the 2020 film award Nika in the category Best Screenplay.

Three Astronauts

Swamp

Post

Metro Exodus

Metro Exodus is based on the book Metro 2035.

Shooting Star

Short stories

Filmography

References

External links

Dmitry Glukhovsky's blog
Dmitry Glukhovsky's Instagram page

1979 births
20th-century Russian male writers
21st-century Russian journalists
21st-century Russian novelists
21st-century Russian short story writers
Fugitives wanted by Russia
Hebrew University of Jerusalem Faculty of Social Sciences alumni
Living people
RT (TV network) people
Russian activists against the 2022 Russian invasion of Ukraine
Russian bloggers
Russian journalists
Russian male novelists
Russian people of Jewish descent
Russian war correspondents
Writers from Moscow
People listed in Russia as media foreign agents